Foreston is an unincorporated community and census-designated place (CDP) in Clarendon County, South Carolina, United States. It was first listed as a CDP prior to the 2020 census with a population of 159.

The Lane Subdivision railway of CSX Transportation runs through the center of Foreston, parallel to US 521.

Demographics

2020 census

Note: the US Census treats Hispanic/Latino as an ethnic category. This table excludes Latinos from the racial categories and assigns them to a separate category. Hispanics/Latinos can be of any race.

References 

Census-designated places in Clarendon County, South Carolina
Census-designated places in South Carolina